Irvin Ternström (17 March 1909 – 5 February 1975) was a Swedish sprinter. He competed in the men's 4 × 100 metres relay at the 1936 Summer Olympics.

References

External links
 

1909 births
1975 deaths
Athletes (track and field) at the 1936 Summer Olympics
Swedish male sprinters
Olympic athletes of Sweden
Place of birth missing
20th-century Swedish people